Malikanda is a village at Wazirpur Upazila in Barisal District, Bangladesh, by the River Sandha. Malikanda has two parts: Dakkhin Malikanda and Uttar Malikanda (South Malikanda and North Malikanda).

References

Populated places in Barisal District